Yulchon LLC is a full-service international corporate law firm headquartered in Seoul, South Korea that was founded in 1997. Initially known as Woo Yun Kang Jeong & Han, the firm changed its name to Yulchon in 2007. Currently, Yulchon employs more than 510 fee earners, including more than 60 licensed in jurisdictions outside of Korea. The firm offers services in the following practice areas: corporate & finance, tax, antitrust, real estate and construction, dispute resolution, and intellectual property.

The firm is widely recognized as one of the top law firms in Korea (5th largest by numbers of attorneys licensed in Korea and 4th in terms of revenue). Yulchon's revenue for the year of 2020 was approximately US$ 211 million.   

Yulchon was selected as the most innovative law firm in South Korea by the Financial Times in 2015 and 2016. In addition, it was recognized as "South Korea Law Firm of the Year" by Chambers & Partners in 2017.  In particular, Yulchon is well-known for its strong tax practice, winning the award of "South Korea Tax Firm of the Year" at the International Tax Review's Asia Tax Awards 2020.  

In July 2013, Yulchon joined Ius Laboris, the international law firm network specialized in employment law.

Main practice areas
Yulchon's main practice areas are:
 Antitrust
 Corporate and finance
 Real estate & construction 
 Dispute resolution
 Labor & Employment
 Intellectual property
 Tax
 Overseas investment
 Industry

Offices
 Korea (Seoul, Headquarters): Parnas Tower 38F,  521 Teheran-ro, Samsung-dong, Gangnam-gu, Seoul 06164
 Vietnam (Ho Chi Minh City): Unit 03, 4th Floor, Kumho Asiana Plaza, 39 Le Duan St., Ben Nghe Ward, Dist.1, Ho Chi Minh City, Vietnam
 Vietnam (Hanoi): Suite 2502, Keangnam Hanoi Landmark Tower, Pham Hung Street, Tu Liem District, Hanoi, Vietnam
 China (Beijing): 9F, SK Tower, No.6 jia, Jianguomenwai Avenue, Chaoyang District, Beijing 100022,P.R. China
 Myanmar (Yangon): Unit 6, 7F, Tower 1, HAGL Myanmar Centre Tower, 192, Kabar Aye Pagoda Road, Bahan Township, Yangon, Myanmar
 Russia (Moscow): 12th Fl. White Gardens Business Center, 7 Ulitsa Lesnaya, Moscow, Russian Federation, 125047
Indonesia (Jakarta): The Energy, 32nd Floor, SCBD Lot 11A, Jalan Jenderal Sudirman, Kav. 52-53, Jakarta 12190, Indonesia

References

External links
 http://www.yulchon.com (official website)

Law firms of South Korea